Gatineau Power Company was an electricity generation and distribution company in Quebec, Canada.

It was originally a subsidiary of Canadian Pacific and later of International Paper. Its operations included a streetcar company which served Hull, Quebec.

The company disappeared as a separate organization after it and other investor-owned electric companies were acquired by Hydro-Québec as part of the nationalization of electricity in Quebec in 1963.

See also 
 History of Hydro-Québec

References

Sources
 Gatineau Power Company. Un quart de siècle de progrès et de service./ 1951? 16 p.; 29 cm.
 Gatineau Power Company.  Trente-cinq ans de progrès et de service. 1961? 16 p.; 28 cm

External links 
 History of Hydro-Québec

Hydro-Québec
Canadian Pacific Railway
Defunct electric power companies of Canada
History of Gatineau